Joey "The Jab" Singleton (born 2 June 1951) is a former British professional boxer who competed from 1973 to 1982. He is a former British light-welterweight champion.

Early life
Singleton was born on 2 June 1951 in, Liverpool, England. He won a full set of titles as a talented amateur fighter, including National Schools, Junior ABA and then senior ABA crown in 1971. He represented Britain a dozen times, winning gold medals at two multi-national tournaments before turning professional under revered fight guru Charles Atkinson.

Professional career
Singleton made his professional debut on 27 March 1973, when he beat Barton McAllister on points. On 5 May, in his third professional bout, he beat Jess Harper for the vacant BBBofC central area light-welterweight title. On 21 November 1974, he beat Part McCormack for the British light-welterweight title. Singleton successfully retained the title twice, beating Alan Salter after the referee stopped the bout in the ninth round, due to a cut on Salter's left eyebrow, and then Des Morrison, beaten on points. On 1 June 1976, Singleton lost the title to Dave Boy Green after he was forced to retire from the bout, due to cuts over both eyes.  

Singleton moved up to welterweight, and on 4 February 1980, beat Terry Peterson on points to claim the BBBofC central area welterweight title. On 17 April 1980, he challenged Jørgen Hansen for the European welterweight title, losing by a  unanimous decision. On 26 October 1980 he successfully defended his central area welterweight title by beating Lee Hartshorn on points.

Professional boxing record

See also
List of British light-welterweight boxing champions

References

External links

|-

1951 births
English male boxers
Living people
Welterweight boxers
Light-welterweight boxers
Boxers from Liverpool
British Boxing Board of Control champions